John Loughborough Pearson  (5 July 1817 – 11 December 1897) was a British Gothic Revival architect renowned for his work on churches and cathedrals. Pearson revived and practised largely the art of vaulting, and acquired in it a proficiency unrivalled in his generation. He worked on at least 210 ecclesiastical buildings in England alone in a career spanning 54 years.

Early life and education
Pearson was born in Brussels on 5 July 1817. He was the son of William Pearson, etcher, of Durham, and was brought up there. At the age of fourteen, he was articled to Ignatius Bonomi, architect, of Durham, whose clergy clientele helped stimulate Pearson's long association with religious architecture, particularly of the Gothic style.

He soon moved to London, where he became a pupil of Philip Hardwick (1792–1870), architect of the Euston Arch and Lincoln's Inn. Pearson lived in central London at 13 Mansfield Street (where a blue plaque commemorates him), and he was awarded the RIBA Royal Gold Medal in 1880.

Career
From the erection of his first church at Ellerker, in Yorkshire, in 1843, to that of St Peter's, Vauxhall, in 1864, his buildings are geometrical in manner and exhibit a close adherence to precedent, but elegance of proportion and refinement of detail lift them out of the commonplace of mere imitation. Holy Trinity, Westminster (1848), and St Mary's, Dalton Holme (1858), are notable examples of this phase.

Pearson began his career drawing purely on English medieval prototypes, but increasingly incorporated ideas from abroad: Charles Locke Eastlake described Pearson's Christchurch at Appleton-le-Moors in North Yorkshire as "modelled on the earliest and severest type of French Gothic, with an admixture of details almost Byzantine in character."

 St Peter's Church, Vauxhall (1864), was his first groined church, and the first of a series of buildings which brought Pearson to the forefront among his contemporaries. In these he applied the Early English style to modern needs and modern economy with unrivalled success. St Augustine's, Kilburn (1871), St John's, Red Lion Square, London (1874, destroyed by a parachute mine in 1941), St Alban's, Conybere Street, Birmingham (1880), St Michael's, Croydon (1880), St John's, Norwood (1881), St Stephen's, Bournemouth (1889), and All Saints Church, Hove (1889), are characteristic examples of his mature work. He also did restoration work on smaller churches, including St Edward's Church in Gloucestershire.

He was enlisted by Sir Tatton Sykes, 5th Baronet to develop the first of what now are known as "The Sykes churches" near Sledmere. Initially Pearson restored the Church of St Michael and All Angels, Garton on the Wolds and the churches at Kirkburn, and Bishop Wilton, along with a new one at Hilton.

Cathedrals 
Pearson is best known for Truro Cathedral (1880), the first Anglican cathedral to be built in England since 1697. It has a special interest in its apt incorporation of the south aisle of the ancient church. Pearson's conservative spirit fitted him for the repair of ancient buildings, and among cathedrals and other historic buildings placed under his care were Lincoln, Chichester, Peterborough, Bristol and Exeter cathedrals, St George's Chapel, Windsor, Westminster Hall, and Westminster Abbey, in the surveyorship of which he succeeded Sir George Gilbert Scott. He re-faced the north transept of Westminster Abbey, except for the porches (which are the work of Scott), and also designed the vigorous organ cases. In his handling of ancient buildings he was repeatedly opposed by the anti-restorers of the Society for the Protection of Ancient Buildings (as in the case of the west front of Peterborough Cathedral in 1896), but he generally proved the soundness of his judgment by his executed work.

While Truro Cathedral is considered his UK masterpiece there are many who consider St John's Cathedral in Brisbane, Australia, his finest work. St John's was initially designed by Pearson and then by his son Frank following his father's death in 1897. The cathedral was constructed between 1906 and 2009 and is a study in contrast to Truro. While lacking some of the decorative detail found at Truro and having shorter towers, the cathedral also departs from the conventional Early English style Neo-Gothic Pearson used extensively at Truro. St John's employs a broad mix of styles: some early English Gothic (lancet windows and bell shaped capitals in the piers); early French Gothic (the pyramidal spires of the towers, and the internal sexpartite vault of the ceiling, also used at Truro); and Spanish Gothic used extensively in the internal design of the nave and sanctuary.  The form of Spanish Gothic used at St John's is based on Barcelona Cathedral. The Barcelona influence can be seen in the nave which has two walls forming double aisles; the inner wall forming the nave arcade which has a wide panel below the triforium to help keep out the subtropical sun. But the Spanish precedent can best been seen in the cathedral's large apsidal sanctuary (wholly different from the conventional English square-end at Truro) whose tall pillars reach from ground floor to the arches immediately below the vault, producing an effect of extraordinary complexity and beauty.

Non-ecclesiastical buildings 
Pearson's practice was not confined to church buildings. Treberfydd (1850), Quar Wood (1858), Lechlade Manor, an Elizabethan house (1873), Westwood House, Sydenham, in the French Renaissance style (1880), the Astor estate offices (1892) upon the Victoria Embankment, London, the remodelling of the interiors of Cliveden House (1893) and No. 18 Carlton House Terrace (1894), with many parsonages, show his aptitude for domestic architecture.

In general design he first aimed at form, embracing both proportion and contour; and his work may be recognized by accurate scholarship coupled with harmonious detail. Its keynotes are cautiousness and refinement rather than boldness.

Recognition 
He was elected an Associate of the Royal Academy in 1874, becoming a full member in 1880. He was also a fellow of the Society of Antiquaries, and a fellow and member of the Council of the Royal Institute of British Architects.

Personal life 
In 1862, Pearson married Jemima Christian, a cousin of his friend Ewan Christian, a Manxman and architect to the Ecclesiastical Commissioners. Their son Frank Loughborough Pearson (1864–1947) was born two years later, but to Pearson's great sorrow Jemima died on 25 March 1865 of typhoid fever. Frank followed in his father's footsteps completing much of his work before embarking on his own original designs.

Pearson is buried in the nave of Westminster Abbey, where his grave is marked by the appropriate motto Sustinuit et abstinuit.

Legacy 
In total, 198 churches created or worked on by Pearson are now listed buildings. In 2016, Historic England commissioned a selective assessment of the significance of The Church and Chapel Interiors of John Loughborough Pearson to help those caring for the buildings to understand the importance of interior fixtures and fittings—particularly movable furniture, which is not covered by listing but a key part of the original designs.

Some notable buildings

St Augustine's, Kilburn (1871–1880) the tower and spire completed (1897–98)
St John the Evangelist, Upper Norwood (1878–1887)
Truro Cathedral (1879–1910)
St Agnes and St Pancras church
St Margaret's, Westminster (existing building, Pearson added eastern and western porches)
Christ Church, Appleton-le-Moors, Yorkshire
Bristol Cathedral, existing building, Pearson added the twin towers of the west front
Wakefield Cathedral, Pearson added a new east end after the church was raised to cathedral status (completed 1903–05 by his son Frank).

Some of Pearson's other important works
 
North Ferriby, Church of All Saints (1846) 
Stow, Lincolnshire, St Mary's Minster (restoration, 1850)
Weybridge, St James's (1853)
 St Matthew's church, Landscove, South Devon (1854)
Church of St Michael and All Angels, Garton on the Wolds (restoration, 1856–57)
St Mary's Church, Catherston Leweston (1857–58)
St Peter's Church, Vauxhall (1863–64)
Freeland, Oxfordshire, St Mary's parish church, parsonage and schools (1869–71)
Kilburn, St Peter's Home (1868)
Wentworth, Church of the Holy Trinity (1872)
Kirk Braddan new church, Isle of Man (1873)
Horsforth, Church of St Margaret (1874)
Cullercoats, St George's (1882)
Chiswick, St Michael's (restoration, 1882)
Hove, St Barnabas' parish church (1882–1883)
Great Yarmouth church (restoration, 1883)
Liverpool, St Agnes' (1883)
St Mary's Church, Lastingham 1879
Silverhill, East Sussex, St Matthew's Church (1884)
Woking Convalescent Home (1884)
Headingley, St Michael's church (1884)
Torquay, All Saints' church (1884)
Maidstone, All Saints' church (restoration, 1885)
Shrewsbury Abbey (1886)
Ayr, Holy Trinity (1886)
Thurstaston, St Bartholomew's (1886)
Hythe, Kent, St Leonard's Church (restoration, 1887)
Oxford, New College, reredos (completion, 1889)
Cambridge, Old Schools, University Library (additions, 1889)
Cheswardine, Shropshire, (St Swithun's) (rebuilding 1889)
Church of St John the Evangelist, Redhill (1889)
St John, Friern Barnet, (1890)
Cambridge, Sidney Sussex College (additions, 1890)
 Fitzrovia Chapel the old Middlesex Hospital chapel (1890)
Bishopsgate, St Helen's parish church (restoration, 1891)
Catholic Apostolic (Irvingite) Church, Maida Avenue, Maida Hill (1891-3)
Barking, All Hallows church (restoration, 1893)
Cambridge, Emmanuel College (additions, 1893)
Ledbury, St Michael's church (restoration, 1894)
Malta, Lady Rachel Hamilton-Gordon Memorial Chapel (1893–1894)
Two Temple Place, London (1895), built as the Astor Estate Office
St Theodore's Church, Port Talbot (1895)
Merthyr Tydfil, St Tydfil's church (1895)
Bordesley St Patrick's Church, Bordesley (1896), demolished 1964
Daybrook, St Paul's Church (1896)
St John's Cathedral, Brisbane, related to Truro Cathedral (the design re-worked by his son, Frank, and completed in 2009)
Nottingham, St Bartholomew's Church (completed by his son, 1899–1902)
Upper Norwood, St John the Evangelist (Consecrated in 1887)

Gallery

See also
List of new ecclesiastical buildings by J. L. Pearson
List of ecclesiastical restorations and alterations by J. L. Pearson
List of non-ecclesiastical works by J. L. Pearson

References

External links

 St Stephens, Bournemouth
 Kirk Braddan, IOM and links to other JLP resources
 St John's Cathedral, Brisbane
 St Augustine's Kilburn, London
 The Bourne Archive: Plan and Description of Lincoln Cathedral.

1817 births
1897 deaths
People from Durham, England
Gothic Revival architects
English ecclesiastical architects
Recipients of the Royal Gold Medal
Architects of cathedrals
19th-century English architects
Royal Academicians
Architects from County Durham